Hadishahr (also Romanized as Hādīshahr, Hādī Shahr, Gargar, Alamdar) is a city in the Central District of Jolfa County, East Azerbaijan province, Iran. At the 2006 census, its population was 27,842 in 7,552 households. The following census in 2011 counted 30,575 people in 8,922 households. The latest census in 2016 showed a population of 34,346 people in 10,744 households.

Near the city of Hadishahr is the ancient site of Kul Tepe Jolfa, dating to the Chalcolithic period (5000–4500 BC). Occupation continued into the late Bronze Age. Pottery shards have been recovered from the Late Chalcolithic, Bronze Age and Urartian periods.

The early site belongs to the Early Trans-Caucasian or Kura-Araxes culture, which spread through the Caucasus and the Urmia Basin.

Notable people
 Haydar Hatemi (painter)
 Dariush Pirniakan (musician)

See also
Kültəpə, Azerbaijan
Kültepe, Turkey
Gargareans

References 

Jolfa County

Cities in East Azerbaijan Province

Populated places in East Azerbaijan Province

Populated places in Jolfa County